A citizen is a person with citizenship, i. e. a membership in a sovereign political community such as a country.

Citizen or citizens may also refer to:

Arts and literature
 "Citizen", a song by Northlane from their 2017 album Mesmer
 Citizen: An American Lyric, a 2014 book by American poet Claudia Rankine.
 Citizen (album), an album by Army of Me
 Citizen (film), a 2001 Tamil film directed by S. Subramaniam
 Citizens (book), a 1989 book on the French revolution by Simon Schama
 Citizens!, a British indie rock band
 Citizens (band), a Christian Contemporary-Indie-Alternative-Rock band from Seattle, Washington.
 Citizen (band), an American emo revival band from Southeast Michigan and Northwest Ohio.
 Citizens (radio series), a British drama series on BBC Radio 4 from 1987 to 1991

Business
 Citizen Holdings or Citizen Watch, a Japanese maker of watches and other consumer electronic devices often branded as "Citizen"
 Citizens Financial Group, an American bank headquartered in Providence, Rhode Island
 Citizens Insurance, the name for state government established, non-profit insurers in the American states of Florida and Louisiana
 Citizens Republic Bancorp, an American bank headquartered in Flint, Michigan

Newspapers
 Citizen (Chicago newspaper), a Chicago newspaper group also producing the Ravenswood Citizen, North Side Citizen, and Uptown Citizen at various times from 1910 to 1930
 The Citizen, a South African national newspaper
 The Ottawa Citizen, a newspaper in Canada's capital known locally as "The Citizen"

Politics

 Citizens (Chilean political party) (Ciudadanos), a Chilean political party
 Citizens (FVG political party), a civic movement active in Friuli Venezia Giulia, Italy
 CITIZENS (Slovak political party) (OBČANIA), name of the Alliance of the New Citizen between 2013 and 2014
 Citizens (Spanish political party) (Ciudadanos), a Spanish political party

Other
 Citizen AA, a sports club in Hong Kong First Division League
 London Citizens, also known as "Citizens", an alliance of community organisations in London
 Old Citizens, alumni of the City of London School
 "The Citizens" is a commonly used nickname for Manchester City F.C.
 "The Citizens" is the former nickname of Norwich City F.C.
Citizen (app), safety-related mobile application

See also
 The Citizen (disambiguation)
 The Daily Citizen (disambiguation)
 Non-citizen (disambiguation)
 Mr. Citizen (disambiguation)
 Citizen X (disambiguation)
 Good Citizen (disambiguation)
 Citizen Jane (disambiguation)
 
 
 Citizen Dog (disambiguation)
 Citizen Force (disambiguation)
 Citizen Soldier (disambiguation)
 Citizen of Paris (disambiguation)
 Chinese citizen (disambiguation)
 Mobile Citizen (disambiguation)
 Citizens' assembly (disambiguation)
 Citizens' Initiative (disambiguation)
 Citizens' Movement (disambiguation)
 Young Citizen Volunteers (disambiguation)